No Time Like Show Time is a children's fantasy mystery novel by Michael Hoeye, first published in 2004. It is the third book in the Hermux Tantamoq series, which includes Time Stops for No Mouse, The Sands of Time, and Time to Smell the Roses.

Plot introduction
Hermux is back in Pinchester after his adventures in the desert, trying to return to his normal life as a watchmaker. He receives a mysterious invitation to the Varmint Variety Theater from the impresario, Fluster Varmint. Fluster is being blackmailed and needs Hermux's help to save his theatre. But show business is a whole new world of weirdness for our modest hero.

Trivia
There is a character nicknamed "Parrot of 1,000 Voices", which may be a reference to Mel Blanc.

External links 
 Official website

2004 American novels
American children's novels
American fantasy novels
Children's fantasy novels
Children's mystery novels
Children's novels about animals
2004 children's books